The Old Kingdom is the period in the 3rd millennium BC. when Egypt attained its first continuous peak of civilization in complexity and achievement.

Old Kingdom may also refer to: 

 Old Kingdom (book series), a high fantasy book series
 Romanian Old Kingdom, the territory covered by the first independent Romanian nation state
 Old Kingdom of Norway
 Old Kingdom of the Hittites